Nenad Zečević (born 7 March 1978) is a Serbian footballer who plays for FK Sloga Temerin.

Born in Novi Sad, SR Serbia, he had played with local club FK Kabel before playing with FK Vojvodina and FK Hajduk Kula in the First League of FR Yugoslavia between 1998 and 2001.  He would have a spell with FK Veternik in the Second League of FR Yugoslavia before moving to Bosnia in 2002 where he played for almost a decade in the Premier League of Bosnia and Herzegovina with FK Rudar Ugljevik, FK Sarajevo, NK Čelik Zenica, FK Radnik Bijeljina, FK Leotar and FK Drina Zvornik.  The exception was the season 2006–07 when he played with Polish side Widzew Łódź in the Ekstraklasa.  During the winter break of the 2011–12 season, after having spent exactly a decade abroad, he returned to Serbia and joined third level side FK Sloga Temerin, playing in the Serbian League Vojvodina.

References

External sources
 

Living people
1978 births
Footballers from Novi Sad
Serbian footballers
Serbian expatriate footballers
FK Kabel players
FK Vojvodina players
FK Hajduk Kula players
FK Veternik players
FK Rudar Ugljevik players
FK Sarajevo players
NK Čelik Zenica players
FK Radnik Bijeljina players
FK Leotar players
FK Drina Zvornik players
Widzew Łódź players
Ekstraklasa players
Expatriate footballers in Poland
Association football midfielders
Serbian expatriate sportspeople in Poland